Aleksandra Apanovich (born December 6, 1969) is a Soviet sprint canoer who competed in the late 1980s. She won two bronze medals at the 1989 ICF Canoe Sprint World Championships in Plovdiv, earning them in the K-2 5000 m and K-4 500 m events.

Apanovich also finished fourth in the K-4 500 m event at the 1988 Summer Olympics in Seoul.

References

Sports-reference.com profile

1969 births
Canoeists at the 1988 Summer Olympics
Living people
Olympic canoeists of the Soviet Union
Soviet female canoeists
Russian female canoeists
ICF Canoe Sprint World Championships medalists in kayak